Led by Edouard Wyss-Dunant, the 1952 Swiss Mount Everest expedition saw Raymond Lambert and Sherpa Tenzing Norgay reach a height of about  on the southeast ridge, setting a new climbing altitude record, opening up a new route to Mount Everest and paving the way for further successes by other expeditions.

Origins
Tibet was closed to foreigners but Nepal had just opened up its borders. In 1951 Eric Shipton's British-New Zealand reconnaissance climbed the Khumbu Icefall and reached the elusive Western Cwm, proving that Everest could be climbed from Nepal. Unfortunately for the British, who had enjoyed exclusive access to the mountain for 31 years from Tibet to the north, the Nepalese government gave the 1952 permit to the Swiss.

Organization

Edouard Wyss-Dunant was appointed as the leader of this expedition. The other Swiss members were Rene Aubert, Leon Flory, André Roch and Raymond Lambert (despite Lambert's having suffered amputation of frostbitten toes).

All the of Swiss expedition members were from Geneva. Most belonged to the exclusive L'Androsace climbing club and knew each other well. The city and canton of Geneva provided moral and financial support for the expedition, and the University of Geneva provided the scientific contingent.

During this expedition Tenzing Norgay was considered, for the first time, a full expedition member ("the greatest honour that had ever been paid me") forging a lasting friendship with the Swiss, in particular Raymond Lambert.

Goals

The mountaineering task that this team had set itself was primarily exploring the access to the South Col, the conquest of the labyrinthine Khumbu Icefall, and possibly the advance to the South Col. John Hunt (who met the team in Zurich on their return) wrote that when the Swiss Expedition "just failed" in the spring they decided to make another (summit ascent) attempt in the autumn; though as it was only decided in June the second party arrived too late, when winter winds were buffeting the mountain. This contradicts a reference which says that "no attempt at an ascent of Everest was ever under consideration in this case".

Ascent
Building on Shipton's experience, the Genevans reached the head of the Western Cwm and climbed the huge face above to the desolate, wind-swept plateau of the South Col. Three Swiss climbers and the Sherpa Tenzing Norgay continued towards the summit, pitching a tent at 8,400 meters. Two returned, leaving Tenzing and Lambert, who had become firm friends, to make a summit attempt. High altitude mountaineering in 1952 was still in its infancy. Even Swiss organisation and technology were not up to the job and, apart from Tenzing, the Sherpas had little experience.

Edmund Hillary recalled in 1953 "an incredibly lonely sight, the battered framework of the tent that Tenzing and Raymond Lambert of the 1952 Swiss expedition pitched over a year before and where they had spent an extremely uncomfortable night without food, without drink, and without sleeping bags. What a tough couple they had been, but perhaps not very well organized." Hillary thought that Tenzing and Lambert were not sufficiently hydrated, having relied on cheese and snow melted over a candle for sustenance (he insisted on everyone keeping their fluids up by melting snow on a Primus stove for water). This was also the conclusion of Griffith Pugh in 1952.

Their oxygen sets were barely operable and when the two men continued in the morning, they were effectively climbing without oxygen. They struggled heroically, at times crawling on all fours, hindered by the dead weight of malfunctioning oxygen sets, finally grinding to a halt near 8595 m, about 250 m short of the summit. The sets gave some relief at rest but were unworkable when climbing because of the resistance of the valves to the passage of oxygen with violent breathing at high altitude. The autumn expedition had two new types of open-circuit oxygen equipment; the better Drägerwerk set was based on apparatus used by pilots, and the oxygen supply could be selected to be between 2 and 4 litres/minute. The Swiss might have reached the summit in the spring if the new Drägerwerk sets had been used.

Results

Tenzing's experience was useful when he was hired to be part of the British expedition in 1953, during which he reached the summit with Sir Edmund Hillary.

The results of this first Swiss expedition to Mount Everest were remarkable, and exceeded even the most optimistic expectations. At the first attempt, it had opened up a new route to the peak of Everest, and it had reached an extraordinary height on the southwestern ridge in difficult conditions. In the opinion of the extremely critical Marcel Kurz, this expedition was almost a victory. They had seen from closeup that the route to the South Summit had no insurmountable barriers, and only the last  to the summit remained unknown. The spring expedition might have reached the summit using the Draeger oxygen sets used for the autumn expedition. They established for the British that in 1953 the route should be up the Lhoste Face not the couloirs, and have a high camp(s) on the South Col (which meant more stores to be carried higher). See Appendix for comparison of the two expeditions. 

The expedition named the Geneva Spur rock formation, between the Western Cwm and the South Col. During the 1956 Swiss Everest–Lhotse expedition, Geneva Spur was the location of the last high camp before Fritz Luchsinger and Ernst Reiss achieved the first ascent of Lhotse summit, on May 18, 1956.

Autumn expedition 
There was a second Swiss expedition in the autumn of 1952, after the monsoon, the first serious attempt to climb Everest at that time of year (having received permission from the Nepalese government to go during the whole year). The autumn expedition was only decided in June so the second party arrived too late, when winter winds were buffeting the mountain. They held out in terrible conditions of discomfort and mental strain, but never succeeded in getting within striking distance of the summit (Hunt had decided that if the 1953 British expedition failed, they would also make another post-moonson attempt).

Appendix 
A comparison of the 1952 Swiss and 1953 British expeditions.

References
 

1952
Everest
Switzerland
Mountaineering in Switzerland
Nepal–Switzerland relations
Tenzing Norgay